Álvaro Gómez Martín (born 6 June 1997) is a Spanish footballer who plays for Langreo as a central midfielder.

Club career
Born in Salamanca, Castile and León, Gómez finished his formation with Valencia CF. On 19 August 2016, he was loaned to Tercera División side UD Alzira for a year.

Gómez made his senior debut on 28 August 2016, starting in a 3–3 away draw against Orihuela CF, and scored his first goal on 26 November in a 4–0 win at CF Recambios Colón. On 7 May 2017, he scored a brace in a 2–0 away defeat of CF Borriol, and finished the season with seven goals.

In the 2017 summer, Gómez moved to Albacete Balompié and was assigned to the reserves also in the fourth level. He made his first-team debut on 29 April 2018, starting in a 1–2 away loss against Sporting de Gijón in the Segunda División.

References

External links

1997 births
Living people
Sportspeople from Salamanca
Spanish footballers
Footballers from Castile and León
Association football midfielders
Segunda División players
Tercera División players
Atlético Albacete players
Albacete Balompié players
Novelda CF players
UP Langreo footballers
21st-century Spanish people